Beit She'arim ( /  / Bet Sharei) or Besara was a Roman-era Jewish village from the 1st century BCE until the 3rd century CE which, at one time, was the seat of the Sanhedrin. The village was later known as Sheikh Bureik, and was depopulated in the early 1920s as a result of the Sursock Purchase.

In the mid-2nd century, the village briefly became the seat of the rabbinic synod under Rabbi Judah ha-Nasi (compiler of the Mishnah), who was buried in the adjoining necropolis.

It is today part of the Beit She'arim National Park.

Location
The site is situated on the spur of a hill about half a kilometer long and 200 meters wide, and lies in the southern extremity of the Lower Galilee mountains, facing the western end of the Jezreel Valley, east of Daliat el-Carmel, south of Kiryat Tivon, and west of Ramat Yishai. It is first mentioned by Josephus as Besara where grain from the King's land was stored.

Identification 

For many years the ancient site of Beit Shearim remained obscure and nearly slipped into oblivion. Some historical geographers thought that Sheikh Abreiḳ was to be identified with Gaba Hippeum (Geba), the site mentioned by Josephus as being in the confines of Mount Carmel.

Historical geographer Samuel Klein argued in 1913 that Beth-Shearim and Besara were to be recognised as one and the same place, an opinion agreed to earlier by C.R. Conder, but he was unable to pin-point its location. In 1936 Alexander Zaïd discovered what he thought was a "new" catacomb among the already known burial caves in the hill directly below Sheikh Abreiḳ, and brought the necropolis to the attention of archaeologist Benjamin Mazar and his brother-in-law Yitzhak Ben-Zvi; Ben-Zvi proposed that this was the burial grounds of the Jewish Patriarchal family of the 2nd-century CE. On this basis Klein proposed that Sheikh Abreik was the ancient site of Beit Shearim, which was corroborated by the discovery of a broken marble slab, from a mausoleum above Catacomb no. 11, containing a Greek inscription, in which the funerary epigram (written during the deceased person's lifetime) bears the words: "I, Justus, the son of [S]appho, of the family Leontius, have died and have been laid to rest...alas... ...esar......", where "...esar..." was interpreted to have been Besara.

Arguably the most definitive pieces of evidence that helped scholars identify Sheikh Bureik with Beit Shearim is the Talmudic reference that the body of Rabbi Judah the Prince, after he had died in Sepphoris, was carried for burial at Beit Shearim, during which funeral procession they made eighteen stops at different stations along the route to eulogize him. Josephus, when speaking about Besara in Vita § 24 (the Jewish-Galilean Aramaic dialect for Beit Shearim), places the village at 60 stadia (more than 11 km.) from Simonias, a distance corresponding with the site at Sheikh Bureik, where is situated the largest Jewish necropolis found in the Land of Israel. This prompted historian Ben-Zvi to suggest that the necropolis at Sheikh Bureik (Shêkh 'Abrêq) and the tombs found there were none other than that of the Patriarchal Dynasty belonging to Judah the Prince.  

These facts prompted seven seasons of systematic excavations at Sheikh Abreiḳ and its necropolis between the years 1936–1940, and 1956, on behalf of the Jewish Palestine Exploration Society, and again in the years 1953–1958 under Nahman Avigad. Additional excavations were conducted at the site in 2006–2007 by archaeologist Yotam Tepper on behalf of the Israel Antiquities Authority, during which season coins from the Roman and Byzantine periods were retrieved.

Site description 

The village site retains the stone foundation of what appears to be a large synagogue (35 × 15 m) and other public buildings in the northeastern quarter of the ruins. A hall directly in front of the synagogue entrance was aligned with two rows of columns, each row containing eight pillars. One large structure (40 × 15 m) on the southwestern part of the hill is thought to have been a basilica which, under the Jewish custom of the time, buildings of such size were used primarily for kings holding court, or for baths, or for royal treasuries. It was constructed of large, smooth-bossed ashlars that were coated with thick plaster. The basilica contained two rows of seven square pillars. Archaeologists have also identified a late Roman "stepped pool" in Beit Shearim, and three 3rd to 4th-century ritual baths (mikveh) on the ancient site. Ancient stone-pavements, cisterns, and walls of hewn-stone can still be seen on the site. Byzantine mosaics have also been found at the site. Remains of a gate and an oil press from the Byzantine period were discovered at the northern edge of the summit, but are thought to have been built in an earlier time.

Necropolis
In the 3rd and 4th centuries CE, the Beit Shearim necropolis became a popular place for Diaspora Jews to send their dead for burial. In 2015, the necropolis was recognised as a UNESCO World Heritage Site.

The cemetery forms the largest known Jewish necropolis in the Levant. Based on the inscriptions found at the necropolis, Jews were being brought for interment at Beit Shearim from all throughout the Jewish Diaspora, such as Beirut, Sidon, Palmyra, Messene in Babylonia and Himyar. The burial caves date from the beginning of the 3rd-century CE.

In wake of the excavations conducted under Nahman Avigad, Avigad remarked: "The fact that in one catacomb nearly one hundred and thirty sarcophagi were discovered, and that there had previously been many more, makes it one of the foremost catacombs of ancient times in so far as the use of sarcophagi is concerned." Conservation work in the catacombs at Beit Shearim has been carried out over the years, in order to check the decay and to preserve old structures.

Early history

Pottery shards discovered at the site indicate that a first settlement there dates back to the Iron Age.

Under Roman rule, it lay within the royal estate of the Herodian dynasty, where Berenice, the sister of Herod Agrippa II stored grain, and marked the border with Ptolemais. The site Beit Shearim is mentioned in the Talmud, along with Yavne, Usha, Shefar'am and Sepphoris, as one of ten migratory journeys taken by the Sanhedrin when it uprooted from Jerusalem. An anecdote about communal life in Beit Shearim has come down in the name of Judah ha-Nasi, who, after mentioning the place, alludes to the practice of its people being observant in the laws of Jewish ritual purity. The Mishnaic sage, Rabbi Johanan ben Nuri (1st–2nd century), made his home in Beit Shearim. During its Jewish settlement in the Second Temple period, the inhabitants of Beit Shearim are believed to have been occupied in husbandry, but when the village land later became a popular burial ground for Diaspora Jews, many of the villagers are thought to have worked in funeral preparations (obsequies) and in stone-masonry.

Benjamin Mazar described the village as a prosperous Jewish town that was eventually destroyed in the first half of the 4th century (ca. 351/2 CE), at the end of the Jewish revolt against Gallus, during which time many towns and villages in Galilee and Judea were assigned to the flames, including Sepphoris. After some time it was renewed as a Byzantine city. More recent research shows that the Gallus revolt had a much lesser impact on the town. The Galilee earthquake of 363 is said to have damaged Beit Shearim, although its damages thought to have been limited.

During the late Byzantine era, the necropolis fell into disuse, notwithstanding signs of human occupancy during the Byzantine period, all throughout the 6th-century, and into the early Arab period, although dwindling in importance.

It later became the village of Sheikh Bureik; it was depopulated in the 1920s after the Sursuk family of Lebanon – who had bought the land from the Ottoman government in 1875 – sold the village to the Jewish National Fund.

See also
Ancient synagogues in the Palestine region
Ancient synagogues in Israel
Archaeology of Israel
Usha (city)
Vigna Randanini - Jewish catacombs in Rome, 2nd-5th century

Further reading

Mazar, Benjamin (1973). Beth She'arim: ha-Ḥevrah la-ḥaḳirat Erets Yiśraʼel ṿe-ʻatiḳoteha, Massada Press on behalf of the Israel Exploration Society and the Institute of Archaeology, Hebrew University, Jerusalem

References

Bibliography 

 (published between 1961 and 1969)

 

 -- 

 -
 (reprinted from 1944 edition)

, s.v.

External links
 The Necropolis of Beit She'arim - A Landmark of Jewish Renewal
 Bet Shearim National Park - Israel Nature and Parks Authority
Survey of Western Palestine, Map 5: IAA, Wikimedia commons

Historic Jewish communities
Ancient villages in Israel
Ancient Jewish settlements of Galilee
Former populated places in Israel
First Jewish–Roman War
Ancient Jewish history
Historic sites in Israel
World Heritage Sites in Israel
Archaeological sites in Israel
National parks of Israel
Jewish cemeteries in Israel
Jezreel Valley Regional Council
Talmud places
Jewish catacombs
Haifa District
Archaeology of Palestine (region)
Sanhedrin